The Sontarans are a fictional race of extraterrestrial humanoids principally portrayed in the British science fiction television programme Doctor Who. A warrior race characterised by their ruthlessness and fearlessness of death, they were conceived by writer and future story editor Robert Holmes and first appeared in the 1973 Doctor Who serial The Time Warrior.

Characteristics

Culture

The Sontarans are a race of humanoids with a stocky build, greenish brown skin, a distinctive dome-shaped head, and they have only three fingers on each hand, though some members of their species do have five fingers. Their musculature is designed for load-bearing rather than leverage, because of the high gravity on their home planet. Ross Jenkins in "The Sontaran Stratagem" describes the main Sontaran villain, General Staal, as resembling "a talking baked potato", whilst in sequel episode "The Poison Sky", Colonel Alan Mace likens the Sontarans to "trolls". Sontarans come from a large, dense planet named Sontar in the "southern spiral arm of the galaxy" which has a very strong gravitational field, which explains their compact stocky form. They are far stronger than humans and, in the recent series, are shorter than the average human male.

The Sontarans have an extremely militaristic culture which prizes discipline and honour as its highest virtues; every aspect of their draconian society is geared toward warfare, and every experience is viewed in terms of its martial relevance. In The Sontaran Experiment, the Fourth Doctor comments that "Sontarans never do anything without a military reason." In fact, to die heroically in battle is their ultimate goal. Aside from a ritualistic chant ("Son-tar-ha!") in "The Sontaran Strategem"/"The Poison Sky", they are never seen to engage in any activity that would be considered recreation, though a few offhand comments by Commander Skorr in "The Poison Sky" suggest they do consider hunting a sport. According to their creator Robert Holmes, Sontarans do have a highly developed artistic culture, but have put it on hold for the duration of the war, while the opening chapter of the novelisation of The Time Warrior, based on Holmes' incomplete draft, refers to Linx listening to the Sontaran anthem while his spaceship is in flight.

The Sontarans depicted in the series have detached, smug personalities, and a highly developed sense of honour; on multiple occasions, the Doctor has used his knowledge of their pride in their species to manipulate them. In "The Sontaran Stratagem", the Doctor nevertheless referred to them as "the finest soldiers in the galaxy".

Although physically formidable, the Sontarans' weak spot is the "probic vent" at the back of their neck, through which they draw nutrition. It is also part of their cloning process. In Earthlike atmospheres, the Sontaran armour suit requires a change of gasses every 27 hours, also conducted through the probic vent. The vent also provides an incentive to continue moving forward in battle since retreat would expose this area to their enemies. They have been killed by targeting that location with a knife (The Invasion of Time), a screwdriver ("Shakedown: Return of the Sontarans"), and an arrow (The Time Warrior). Even something as simple as a squash ball aimed at that point ("The Sontaran Stratagem"), contact by the heel of a shoe ("The Last Sontaran"), or a blow from a wok ("War of the Sontarans") is capable of incapacitating them temporarily. They are also vulnerable to "coronic acid" (The Two Doctors). While the Sontarans wear protective helmets in battle, to fight without their helmets, or to be "open-skinned," is an honour for the Sontarans.

In the episode "The Poison Sky", it is revealed that the Sontaran Empire have been at war with the Rutan Host for more than 50,000 years, and which, at a time around 2008, they are losing. The war is still raging at least 20,000 years later, in the serial The Sontaran Experiment. It was joked that the two species have been at war for so long, they had almost forgotten the reason why. ("The Two Doctors")

Most of the Sontarans depicted in the television series have had short names, many beginning with an initial 'st' sound. Examples include Styre (The Sontaran Experiment), Stor (The Invasion of Time), Stike (The Two Doctors), Staal ("The Sontaran Stratagem" / "The Poison Sky"), Stark ("The Pandorica Opens"), Strax and Stenck ("The Vanquishers"); others are Skorr ("The Sontaran Stratagem" / "The Poison Sky"), Ritskaw and Kragar ("The Halloween Apocalypse"), Skaak ("War of the Sontarans"), Linx (The Time Warrior), Varl (The Two Doctors), Jask ("The End of Time") and Kaagh (The Sarah Jane Adventures)). Elements of the Sontaran military structure mentioned in the series include the "Sontaran G3 Military Assessment Survey" and the "Grand Strategic Council", the Ninth Sontaran Battle Group, the "Fifth Army Space Fleet of the Sontaran Army Space Corps", and the "Tenth Sontaran Battle Fleet". Military titles include Commander, Group Marshal, Field Major, and General. Agnomens include "the Undefeated", "the Bloodbringer", "the Avenger", and "the Slayer".

Reproduction and gender identity
The Sontarans are a monogender-asexual (a "male gender-only" species); they reproduce by means of cloning rather than sexual reproduction, and thus for the most part are extremely similar in appearance. Human characters in both The Sontaran Experiment and "The Sontaran Stratagem" comment on how closely individual Sontarans resemble one another; however, their height, skin tone, facial features, vocal timbre and accent, hair, spacing of teeth and even number of fingers have varied from story to story, and sometimes within stories. When Luke Rattigan asks how they can tell each other apart in "The Sontaran Stratagem", General Staal remarks that they say the same of humans.

In The Time Warrior, Linx states that "at the Sontaran Military Academy we have hatchings of a million cadets at each muster parade." The Doctor also comments in The Invasion of Time that Sontarans can mass-clone themselves at rates up to a million embryos every four minutes. Thereafter the clones take just ten minutes to grow to adulthood. When the Sontaran reach adulthood, under the charge of the Sontaran High Command, each warrior is immediately given a rank and dispatched on a battle mission. From day one, the Sontarans are sent to battle. The audio The King of Sontar introduces a unique occasion where one Sontaran is the only result of a clone batch, the resulting Sontaran being essentially a million Sontarans in one, making him far taller than the average for his species and lacking a probic vent.

Sontarans reproduce asexually and all the Sontarans depicted in the television series are of one gender; referred to with masculine pronouns, however it is not known if they possess distinctly male physiologies. General Staal comments that "words are the weapons of womenfolk" and that the clone of Martha Jones performed well "for a female" as commentary on the gender inequalities of other species. This typifies a Sontaran trait: interested only in the strongest fighters in any group or race. Despite this, Strax appeared perfectly comfortable with the prospect of wearing dresses in "The Battle of Demon's Run - Two Days Later"; he ultimately dressed in human gentleman's attire, nevertheless. In The Time Warrior, when Linx examines Sarah Jane, he comments on how the human reproduction system is 'inefficient' and that humans 'should change it'. As multiple genders are foreign to them, Sontarans are known to confuse the human male and female sexes; Strax routinely addresses young women as "Boy" and vice versa, and claims not to have known that River Song was a woman.

In "The Sontaran Stratagem", the Sontarans are seen to create human clones by growing them in tubs of green fluid. Enemy of the Bane confirms that Sontarans are cloned in the same way. In a human clone, the umbilical corresponds to the probic vent on the back of a Sontaran's neck, suggesting that the vent is not unlike the human navel, albeit clearly more complex.

Technology
The Tenth Sontaran Battle Fleet in the new series consists of a Command Ship and a number of capsules that can be moved into position when Battle Status is enjoined. Sontaran ships are impervious to nuclear missiles, however in War of the Sontarans they are vulnerable to both ramming by another Sontaran ship and also to explosions of barrels of gunpowder. In both the classic and new series, Sontarans are depicted using spherical or semi-spherical single-occupant spacecraft known as capsules. Each capsule is small enough to avoid detection by radar and is piloted by an individual Sontaran. The Sontaran Stratagem also saw the introduction of a large mothership from which the small Sontaran capsules could be seen to originate. The Doctor notes that the one ship by itself is enough to completely wipe out Earth.

The Sontarans have a variety of weapons. Their distinctive weapon is a small rod with two handles and a plunger at one end, giving it a syringe style. This is so it can be held and fired using three fingers. This weapon fires a disabling beam that can temporarily render a person useless and emits an energy pulse that can repair systems like the teleport, and has appeared in every Sontaran story except The Sontaran Experiment. When first used by Commander Linx in The Time Warrior, it shows the ability to fire a beam which can disarm by knocking the weapon out of the wielder's hand, hypnotise, as well as cutting through wood, disabling limbs and killing.

In The Sontaran Experiment, Field Major Styre instead used a small red laser pistol which only killed (although it did not kill the Doctor, because of a small metal plate the Doctor had been keeping in his inside pocket). The Invasion of Time saw Commander Stor using the small rod again, but also in episode six, a Sontaran trooper uses a short black rifle-like laser to try to burn through a lock on a door inside the TARDIS. The Two Doctors introduced a weapon called the Meson Gun (as named in the Jim'll Fix It Sketch, A Fix with Sontarans), a large silver rifle with a red fuel tank in the centre which was used by Group Marshal Stike and Varl in the third episode. It seemed to be some kind of flamethrower as it fired a jet of flames very briefly. Group Marshal Stike was also seen carrying a baton.

It would not be until The Sontaran Stratagem that General Staal would show that the baton can fire an orange beam that could stun the target. In The Poison Sky, Commander Skorr and his troops carry large laser rifles into battle. These rifles are the Sontaran gun of the Tenth Sontaran Battle Fleet. Each rifle has a laser beam that kills instantly and is designed for a three-fingered grip. In The Invasion of Time, their armour is shown to be resistant to Time Lord stasers and K-9's blaster. However, their armour is vulnerable to standard human firearms in "The Poison Sky", but the Sontarans in that episode used a 'cordolane signal' which caused the copper-lined bullets to expand, jamming most firearms instantly. UNIT troops overcame this by switching to steel-lined bullets.

The Sarah Jane Adventures story The Last Sontaran showed further technological advancements of the modern Sontarans. Commander Kaagh, a surviving pilot from the Tenth Sontaran Battle Fleet, had slightly different armour due to being from the special forces. His suit featured no gloves, so his bare hands were visible, and on his left arm was a control panel for his suit and ship. His helmet could fold up and retract and both his suit and ship featured cloaking devices, turning them both invisible. While the soldiers of the Tenth Fleet were armed with large laser rifles, Kaagh has a smaller laser carbine. Rather than hypnotising humans (as Sarah pointed out they usually do), instead, Kaagh fixed neural control devices to the back of the necks of his human agents. A red light flashes when it is operational, and Kaagh can activate and deactivate them when he wants with his control panel.

A pair of Sontarans that tried to invade Trenzalore in "Time of the Doctor" used a two-man craft with an invisibility field.

Appearances

Television
During rehearsals for their first appearance, Kevin Lindsay, who portrayed the original Sontaran, Linx, pronounced the race's name as "son-TAR-an." Alan Bromly, the director, tried to correct him by saying it should be pronounced with the stress on the first syllable. Lindsay declared "Well, I think it's "son-TAR-an", and since I'm from the place, I should know." His preferred pronunciation was retained.

The Sontarans made their first appearance in 1973 in the serial The Time Warrior by Robert Holmes, where Linx is stranded in the Middle Ages. Linx uses a projector to bring back human scientists from the future to fix his spacecraft.

Another Sontaran named Styre appears in The Sontaran Experiment (1975), experimenting on captured astronauts on a far future Earth. Their third appearance is in The Invasion of Time, where they successfully invade Gallifrey, but are driven out again after less than a day. They appeared for the final time in the original series in The Two Doctors. The Sontarans also appeared in a skit for the BBC children's programme Jim'll Fix It titled "A Fix with Sontarans", along with Colin Baker as the Sixth Doctor and Janet Fielding as Tegan Jovanka. References are made in Sontaran episodes to the Rutan Host, an equally militaristic race with whom the Sontarans have been at war for thousands of years; a Rutan is seen in Horror of Fang Rock (1977), which does not feature the Sontarans, but have not featured in the television series again.

Sporting an updated design, Sontarans returned to the revived series in the Series 4 episodes "The Sontaran Strategem" and "The Poison Sky" (2008). The Sontarans plan to terraform the Earth into a new clone world, but their plans are averted by the Tenth Doctor (David Tennant). It is also revealed that the race was excluded from the Last Great Time War of the revived series' backstory. In "Turn Left" (2008), the same events are depicted in a parallel universe, where Rose Tyler (Billie Piper) describes their plan as foiled by Torchwood (characters from the spin-off show of that name), at the cost of their lives, with Torchwood leader Captain Jack Harkness (John Barrowman) being captured by the Sontarans. In "The Stolen Earth" (2008), UNIT is revealed to have developed a teleportation device based on Sontaran technology. A lone survivor from the events of "The Poison Sky", Commander Kaagh (Anthony O'Donnell), next appears in The Last Sontaran (2008), from spin-off series The Sarah Jane Adventures. Kaagh appears again in Enemy of the Bane (2008). In Doctor Whos "The End of Time, Part Two" (2010), a Sontaran sniper (Dan Starkey) briefly appears pursuing the Doctor's former companions Mickey Smith (Noel Clarke) and his wife Martha Jones (Freema Agyeman), but is defeated by the Doctor before he can assassinate them. Alongside the Eleventh Doctor (Matt Smith), Sontaran battle fleets are seen in Series 5 finale episode, "The Pandorica Opens" (2010), as part of an alliance of the Doctor's enemies. Series 6 episode "A Good Man Goes to War" (2011) introduces Commander Strax (Starkey), a Sontaran nurse who has been assigned this role as a means of making penance. He fights on the side of the Doctor and his allies, which include the Silurian warrior Madame Vastra (Neve McIntosh) and her wife, Jenny Flint (Catrin Stewart). Strax then appears alongside Vastra and Jenny in "The Snowmen" (2012), "The Crimson Horror", "The Name of the Doctor" (both 2013), and "Deep Breath" (2014). A troop of Sontarans is also shown among Trenzalore's invaders in the 2013 Christmas special "The Time of the Doctor". A Sontaran appears briefly in the 2015 episode "Face the Raven" as a refugee.

The appearance of the Sontarans was redesigned for the Thirteenth Doctor's final season, 'Flux', where they reappeared in their first major antagonistic role since 2008. First appearing in the season premiere, 'Chapter 1: The Halloween Apocalypse', the Sontarans plan to exploit the Flux crisis to take over Earth in its various time periods. They sent a group back in time to Crimean War-era Sevastopol in 'Chapter 2: The War of the Sontarans' as a trial run, only to be defeated by the Doctor while Dan and Karvanista take out the main fleet. The Sontarans reappear in the cliffhanger for 'Chapter Five: Survivors of the Flux', where they invade and take over earth during the flux crisis thanks to the intervention of their ally the Grand Serpent. In 'Chapter Six: The Vanquishers', the Doctor and her allies learn the Sontarans plan to trick the Cybermen and Daleks into being consumed by the flux while staying safe themselves by hijacking the Lupari ships, however the Doctor hijacks the ships herself and uses the flux event to destroy the Sontaran army as well.

Games

The origins of the Sontarans have not been revealed in the television series. The Doctor Who role-playing game published by FASA claimed that they were all descended from the genetic stock of General Sontar (or Sontaris), who used newly developed bioengineering techniques to clone millions of duplicates of himself and annihilated the non-clone population. He renamed the race after himself and turned the Sontarans into an expansionist and warlike society set on universal conquest. However, this origin has no basis in anything seen in the television series.

The Sontarans have also appeared as a character in the PC game Destiny of the Doctors released on 5 December 1997, by BBC Multimedia. They can be defeated by firing the occupants of an angry beehive at them.

The Sontarans appear in the Doctor Who: The Adventure Games episode, "The Gunpowder Plot".

Other appearances
Big Finish Productions first used the Sontarans for their audio drama Heroes of Sontar, a 2011 Fifth Doctor (Peter Davison) story, depicting the Doctor and his companions being forced to aid a Sontaran attack squad against a dangerous enemy that has threatened the Sontaran race by compromising their strategic methods. They next featured in The Five Companions and were stuck in an alternative version of the Death Zone with the Fifth Doctor and various companions. In 2012, The First Sontarans was released. A Sixth Doctor Lost Story from the mid-1980s, written by Andrew Smith, it features the Sontarans and the Rutans on nineteenth century Earth, tracking down a scientist named Jacob, who escaped through time and space. It is revealed that Jacob is from Sontar, and was responsible for genetically creating the Sontarans as a defence against a Rutan invasion. They were first developed on Sontar's gravity-heavy moon and quickly proved themselves to be at least on par with the unstoppable Rutan horde. However, believing themselves to be superior, the Sontarans turned on their creators to prevent their knowledge of Sontaran weaknesses being discovered and exploited by their enemies, conquering the planet Sontar and changing it to suit their biology. The audio ends with the Doctor and Peri helping Jacob and his wife fake their deaths so that they can go into hiding on a primitive, isolated planet to get away from their need for revenge on the Sontarans. The Sontarans also feature in the Early Adventures audio The Sontarans, which depicts the First Doctor (William Hartnell), Steven Taylor and Sara Kingdom encountering the Sontarans during an invasion of an asteroid colony at some point before Sara's time, prompting Sara to observe that she is aware of how this confrontation will end from her own histories; this audio serves as the Doctor's chronologically earliest encounter with the Sontarans. The audio Terror of the Sontarans saw the Seventh Doctor (Sylvester McCoy) and Mel Bush (Bonnie Langford) meet the Sontarans on an old mining colony that had been used as a Sontaran outpost, until a complex chain of events unintentionally created a new life form that was psychically tortured by the pain of the Sontarans' victims, forcing the Doctor to destroy the colony in the hope that the non-corporeal entity will reform into something more benevolent. They also appear in the 2014 story The Sontaran Ordeal as part of the Classic Doctors New Monsters range. In this story, the Eighth Doctor (Paul McGann) comes against a group of Sontarans led by General Stenk (Christopher Ryan) who try to get into the greatest of all wars: the Time War.

Other appearances by the Sontarans include the spin-off videos Mindgame, Shakedown: Return of the Sontarans and Do You Have A License To Save This Planet?; three audio plays by BBV: Silent Warrior, Old Soldiers and Conduct Unbecoming; the Faction Paradox audio The Shadow Play; and a cameo appearance in Infidel's Comet. Shakedown marks the only occasion in which the Sontarans and their Rutan foes appear on screen together, and was adapted into a Virgin New Adventures novel where the Seventh Doctor must prevent the Sontarans gained a clear advantage in the conflict.

They have also appeared in several spin-off novels, including Lords of the Storm by David A. McIntee, where the Fifth Doctor and Turlough have to stop a Sontaran scheme to take control of a colony world where Tzun technology has been hidden. In The Infinity Doctors by Lance Parkin, an apparently alternate version of the Doctor negotiated a peace between the Sontarans and the Rutan Host when two of them were left trapped in a TARDIS for several hours and got to talking due to their inability to kill each other. General Sontar also made an appearance in that novel. In The Crystal Bucephalus by Craig Hinton, the name of their planet was given as Sontara. The Sontarans also briefly appear in The Eight Doctors, sent to the Eye of Orion by an agent of the Celestial Intervention Agency to kill the Fifth and Eighth Doctors. The novel Warmonger sees the Sontarans join an alliance of alien races assembled by the Fifth Doctor to defeat the mercenary army of renegade Time Lord Morbius, although the Sontarans are unaware that they follow the Doctor as he adopts the alias of 'Supreme Coordinator', which is shortened to 'Supremo' by his Ogron bodyguards.

In 1982, Jean Airey's novella The Doctor and the Enterprise featured a crossover between the universes of Doctor Who and Star Trek, in which the Fourth Doctor (Tom Baker) finds himself on the USS Enterprise. The Enterprise is attacked by a Sontaran fleet (which is unrecognizable to Captain Kirk and crew), prompting the Doctor to urgently warn the crew to flee the area.

They appear in 2009, in the novella The Sontaran Games by Jacqueline Rayner, featuring the Tenth Doctor and appeared in the New Series Adventures (Doctor Who) book The Taking of Chelsea 426 by David Llewellyn, featuring the Tenth Doctor, fighting both times against the Rutan Host.

In 2008, as part of Character options first series 4 2008 wave of action figures, they released some Sontaran action figures. These include General Staal, Commander Skorr and several Sontaran soldiers.

The Sontarans are mentioned in the audio book Wraith World, when Clyde Langer (Daniel Anthony) remarks he cannot understand why Luke Smith (Tommy Knight) and Rani Chandra (Anjli Mohindra) would want to read about made up adventures, when they have faced Sontarans.

Comic books
The Sontarans have also appeared several times in the Doctor Who Magazine comic strip, both as adversaries of the Doctor and in strips not involving the Doctor. In The Outsider (DWM #25-26), by Steve Moore and David Lloyd, a Sontaran named Skrant invaded the world of Brahtilis with the unwitting help of Demimon, a local astrologer. The Fourth Doctor faced the Sontarans in Dragon's Claw (DWM #39-#45), by Steve Moore and Dave Gibbons, where a crew of Sontarans menaced China in 1522 AD.

In Steven Moffat's short story "What I Did on My Christmas Holidays by Sally Sparrow" (the basis for the Tenth Doctor episode "Blink"), the Ninth Doctor has a rooftop sword fight with two Sontarans in 21st century Istanbul, defeating them with the help of spy Sally Sparrow, apparently before the events of "Rose" in his personal timeline.

The Sontaran homeworld was destroyed in the future during the events of the Seventh Doctor strip Pureblood (DWM #193-196) but the Sontaran race pool survived, allowing for further cloning; the strip introduced the concept of "pureblood" Sontarans not born of cloning. The Sontarans also feature in the Kroton solo strip Unnatural Born Killers (DWM #277) and the Tenth Doctor's comic strip debut The Betrothal of Sontar (DWM #365-#368), by John Tomlinson and Nick Abadzis, where a Sontaran mining rig on the ice planet Serac comes under attack by a mysterious force.

Summary of appearances 
This list does not include Strax who has his own list.

Doctor Who
 The Time Warrior (1973)
 The Sontaran Experiment (1975)
 The Invasion of Time (1978)
 The Two Doctors (1985)
 "The Sontaran Stratagem" / "The Poison Sky" (2008)
 Flux (2021)
"The Halloween Apocalypse" (2021)
"War of the Sontarans" (2021)
"Survivors of the Flux" (2021)
"The Vanquishers" (2021)

Cameos
 "The End of Time" (2010)
 "The Pandorica Opens" (2010)
 "A Good Man Goes to War" (2011)
 "The Time of the Doctor" (2013)
 "Face the Raven" (2015)

The Sarah Jane Adventures
 The Last Sontaran (2008)
 Enemy of the Bane (2008)

Notes

References

External links

Doctor Who races
Fictional characters with superhuman strength
Fictional clones
Fictional warrior races
Television characters introduced in 1973
The Sarah Jane Adventures characters